Faceless is a 2003 novel by Ghanain writer Amma Darko. The novel highlights the abuse of the girl-child and women in Africa. The novel received critical reviews.

Plot summary

The novel is set in Sodom and Gommorah, a suburb ghetto town in Ghana. It is mostly about Baby T, who is abused by his neighbour Onko.

Theme
The novel predominantly focuses on child abuse and received by both women and the girl-child in Africa.

DISCRIMINATION AGAINST WOMEN

In the Novel "Faceless", female characters bear the hardship from male characters that was mostly Absent Father's, murderers and rapists.
Take for instance a male character called "Kwei" MaaTsuru lover and the Father of her four children abandoned her because of superstitious belief that say she was cursed.

References

2003 novels
Ghana in fiction
Novels set in Ghana
Ghanaian novels